is a Japanese record label that publishes video game music albums.

List of video game albums released

A -
B - C -
D - E -
F - G -
H - 
 I  -
J - K -
L - M -
N - O -
P - Q -
R - S -
T - U -
V - W -
X - Y -
Z

#
3LDK ~Shiawase ni Narou yo~ Original Music Countdown SCDC-00373

A
ACECOMBAT 04 shattered skies Original Soundtrack SCDC-00146
Advance Guardian Heroes Original Soundtrack SCDC-00371
After... Complete Vocal Collection SCDC-00326
AGNOIA Drama CD Phrase2 SCDC-00054
Anata ni Todoke! In Aki (Autumn) SCDC-00049
Anata ni todoke! In Fuyu / Mayuko Omimura SCDC-00008
Anata ni todoke! In Haru / Mayuko Omimura SCDC-00012
Anata ni todoke! In Natsu SCDC-00031
Anata to issho - Yuki (Snow) SCDC-00057
Anata to Issho Hana SCDC-00078
Anata to issho Sora SCDC-00133
Ashita wa hareru SCDC-00065

B
Backlash Drama CD SCDC-00380
Bakusou Dekotora Legend Original Soundtrack SCDC-00400
Barashi SCDC-00105
Berwick Saga ~Lazberia chronicle chapter 174~ Soundtrack SCDC-00457/9
Birthday Disc "Virgo" (Otome-za) Yuka Imai SCDC-00129
Bloody Roar 3 Sound Track SCDC-00082
Bomberman the Music SCDC-00466
Bu ni Fu goo SCDC-00316

C
Capcom Game Music SCDC-00193
Capcom Game Music VOL.2 SCDC-00195
Capcom Game Music VOL.3 SCDC-00198
Castle Fantasia ~Record of Elencia War~ Sound Collection SCDC-00397
Chaos Seed Soundtrack ~ Game Sound Legend Series SCDC-00522~24
Choujou Kessen: Saikyou Fighters SNK vs. CAPCOM SCDC-00005
Close to Inori no Oka [Drama CD] SCDC-00090
Close to Inori no Oka Sound Collection SCDC-00083
Cool Cool Toon SCDC-00047

D
Dark Chronicle Original Sound Tracks SCDC-00243
Dear Melodies "HEAL" Scitron Discs Girls Vocal Best Selection SCDC-00197
Dear Melodies "LEAF" Scitron Discs Girls Vocal Best Selection SCDC-00196
Delete Me SCDC-00486~8
DoDonPachi II & DoDonPachi Original Soundtracks SCDC-00126
Dokidoki Pretty League: Lovely Star SCDC-00015
Dokodemo issho Soundtrack: Koneko mo issho SCDC-00009

E
Estpolis Biography Sound Track SCDC-00486~89
Ever 17 Single Collection Action 1 SCDC-00237
Ever 17 Single Collection Action 2 SCDC-00246
Ever 17 Single Collection Action 3 SCDC-00256
Ever 17 Single Collection Action 4 SCDC-00258
Ever 17 Vocal Collection SCDC-283
Ever17 ~the out of infinity~ Sound Collection SCDC-00204
Ever17 ~the out of infinity~ Vocal Collection SCDC-00283

F
F-Zero GX/AX Original Soundtracks SCDC-00358~9
Famicom 20th Anniversary Arrange Sound Tracks SCDC-00320
Famicom 20th Anniversary Original Sound Tracks Vol. 1 SCDC-00317
Famicom 20th Anniversary Original Sound Tracks Vol. 2 SCDC-00318
Famicom 20th Anniversary Original Sound Tracks Vol. 3 SCDC-00319
Famicom MUSIC VOL.2 SCDC-00151
Famicom Sound History Series "Mario the Music" SCDC-00360
Fuhai no teio agehacho no rakuin Drama CD SCDC-00074
Fushigi yugi - Eikou den SCDC-00152
Futaba Riho First Album SCDC-00379

G
Gacha Mecha Stadium Saru Battle Sound Tracks!! SCDC-00372
GALERIANS: Ash Original Soundtrack SCDC-00178
GALERIANS: Ash Original Soundtrack SCDC-00176
GALERIANS: The Rion Original Soundtrack SCDC-00177
Game Music Now & Then SCDC-00292~3
GAME SOUND LEGEND ~ Famicom Game Music SCDC-00145
Game Sound Legend Arrange Series - Back In The S.S.T.Band!! ~The Very Best~ SCDC-00312
Game Sound Legend Arrange Series "G.M.O. Arrange Album" SCDC-00489
Game Sound Legend Arrange Series "Speed & Wind" SCDC-00375
Game Sound Legend Series - That's Atari Music SCDC-00313
Game Sound Legend Series - That's Atari Music Vol.2 SCDC-00314
Game Sound Legend Series "G.M.O. Christmas Songs" SCDC-00468
Game Sound Legend Series "Konami Game Music Vol. 4 ~A-JAX~" SCDC-00472
Game Sound Legend Series "Konamic Game Freaks" SCDC-00465
Game Sound Legend Series "LEGEND OF GAME MUSIC ~CONSUMER BOX~" SCDC-00497~505
Game Sound Legend Series -Apollon Game Music Box ~Memorial Sounds of Wizardry~ SCDC-00509~14
Game Sound Legend Series Box 2 ~Platinum Box~ SCDC-00473
Game Sound Legend Series CD-BOX (8CDs + DVD) SCDC-00410
Garasu (Glass) no Mori Sound Collection SCDC-00220
Garou Densetsu Mark of the Wolves Original Sound Trax SCDC-00006
Guardian Angel: Sound Collection SCDC-00249
GUILTY GEAR X Vol.1 (Drama CD) SCDC-00132
GUILTY GEAR X Vol.2 (Drama CD) SCDC-00137
Guilty Gear XX Original Soundtrack SCDC-00191~2
Gunstar Heroes Sound Collection SCDC-00470

H
HAPPY SALVAGE Audio Drama SCDC-00011
Happy Salvage Soundtrack. SCDC-00025
Hard Luck Return of the Heroes Original Soundtrack SCDC-00388
Hayari Gami Drama CD SCDC-00362
Hayari Gami Original Soundtrack SCDC-00361

I
infinity SCDC-00020

J
Jet Set Radio Future Original Sound Tracks SCDC-00166

K
Kakutou Chojin: Original Soundtracks SCDC-00253
Kawaii? Nee, Darlin SCDC-00068
Killer7 Original Sound Track SCDC-00451~2
King of Fighters 2000 Arrange Sound Trax, The SCDC-00041
The King of Fighters 2000 Drama CD SCDC-00042
The King of Fighters 2000 Original Sound Trax SCDC-00035
The King of Fighters 2001 Original Sound Trax SCDC-00143
The King of Fighters 2002: Be The Fighter! Original Sound Trax SCDC-00221
The King of Fighters 2003 Arrange Tracks - Consumer Version SCDC-00386
The King of Fighters 2003 Original Sound Tracks SCDC-00337
The King Of Fighters Best Arrange Collection since 94 to 00 SCDC-00014
The King of Fighters XI Sound Collection SCDC-00517~8
King of Fighters Maximum Impact Original Soundtrack SCDC-00363~4
King of Fighters Neo Wave Arrange Tracks -Consumer Version- SCDC-00455
KIZUNA ~ Bonds / Fly away SCDC-00377
Klonoa of the Wind 2 ~Something Forgotten Wished by the World~ Original Soundtrack SCDC-00201~2
Konami Famicom Super Medley SCDC-00467
Konami Game Music Vol.1 SCDC-00050
Konami Game Music Vol.2 SCDC-00060
Konami Game Music VOL.4 A JAX SCDC-00069
KONOHANA: True Report Drama CD SCDC-00086
KONOHANA: True Report Sound Collection SCDC-00076
Kotasu 006 SCDC-00114
Koyasu 001 SCDC-00038
Koyasu 002 SCDC-00044
Koyasu 003 SCDC-00053
Koyasu 004 SCDC-00067
Koyasu 005 SCDC-00077

L
La Pucelle ~Legend of the Holy Maiden of Light~ Arrange Soundtrack SCDC-00183
La Pucelle ~Legend of the Holy Maiden of Light~ Drama CD SCDC-190
Legend Compilation Series: Classics in Game Music SCDC-00463
Legend Consumer Series: Summer Carnival '92 Recca Original Soundtrack SCDC-00461
Lilly's Atelier The Alchemist of Zalburg Original Soundtrack SCDC-00118
LITTLE PRINCESS Puppet Princess of Marl's Kingdom 2: Drama CD SCDC-00030
Lovely Star SCDC-00013

M
Majin-kishi Jack Geist Original Soundtrack SCDC-00066
Makai Senki Disgaea Drama CD SCDC-00278
MARIO & ZELDA BIG BAND LIVE CD SCDC-00315
Memories ofF Maxi Single Collection Vol.3 Kaoru Otoha (Yukari Tamura) SCDC-00063
Memories Off SCDC-00002
Memories Off - Piano Collection Vol.1 SCDC-00222
Memories Off - Sound Collection plus alpha SCDC-00157
Memories Off 1st SCDC-00159
Memories Off 2nd (Drama series) Vol. Takano no oshaberi & cleaning SCDC-00218
Memories Off 2nd CD Drama SCDC-00138
Memories Off 2nd Complete Box SCDC-300
Memories Off 2nd Drama series Vol.1 Hotaru no oshaberi & cleaning SCDC-00200
Memories Off 2nd Drama Series Vol.2 Tsubame no oshaberi & cleaning SCDC-00203
Memories Off 2nd Drama series Vol.3 Tomoe no oshaberi & cleaning SCDC-00207
Memories Off 2nd Mini Album Collection Vol.2 - Imitation SCDC-00136
Memories Off 2nd Mini Album Collection Vol.3 SCDC-00141
Memories Off 2nd Mini Album Collection Vol.4 Tsubame Minami CD Drama SCDC-00144
Memories Off 2nd Mini Album Collection Vol.5 - Futatsu no Kokoro wa SCDC-00149
Memories Off 2nd Mini Album Collection Vol.6 SCDC-00150
Memories Off 2nd Sound Collection SCDC-00127
Memories Off 3.5 Sound Collection SCDC-00366
Memories Off Collectors Box [Limited Edition] SCDC-00426~32
Memories Off Complete Box SCDC-00107
Memories off maxi single collection Vol.4 SCDC-00070
Memories Off Orgel Collection SCDC-00394
Memories Off Piano Collection Vol.2 SCDC-299
Memories Off Vol 2 Ame no Hi no Omi SCDC-00059
Memories Off: 2nd Maxi Single Collection Vol.1 Hotaru Shirakawa SCDC-00104
Memories off: Drama CD SCDC-00016
Memories Off: Drama CD "Bridge" SCDC-00131
Memories off: Maxi Single Collection Vol.1 SCDC-00051
Memories off: Maxi Single Collection Vol.5 Yue Imasaka (Megumi Nasu) SCDC-00075
Memories off: Maxi Single Collection Vol.6 Minamo Ibuki (Kumi Kawai) with Collection BOX SCDC-00080
Memories Off: Piano Collection Vol. 2 SCDC-00299
Metroid Prime & Fusion Original Soundtracks SCDC-00276~7
Michigan Original Sound Tracks SCDC-00378
Milky Season - Vocal Collection SCDC-00210
Milky Season Pair Collection Vol.2 SCDC-00169
Milky Season Pair Collection Vol.3 SCDC-00175
Milky Season Pair Collection Vol.6 With Collection Box SCDC-00194
Milky Season Sound Collection SCDC-00164
Minna de tsukuru Memo-Off (Memories Off) CD!! SCDC-00174
Minna de tsukuru Yuukyuu CD!! SCDC-00033
Missing Blue Drama CD SCDC-00120
Missing Blue Sound Collection + Alpha SCDC-00101
Moekan: Original Soundtrack SCDC-00257
Mr. Driller Soundtracks SCDC-00178~9
My Merry May Sound Collections SCDC-00184

N
Namco Arcade 80's SCDC-00272
Namco Game Music Vol. 1 ~ Game Sound Legend SCDC-217
Namco Game Music Vol. 2 ~ Game Sound Legend SCDC-00234
Namco Video Game Music SCDC-00003
Namcot Super Medley SCDC-00398
Natsuiro Celebration SCDC-00046
Natsuiro: Hoshikuzu no Memory - Original Soundtrack SCDC-00433
Natsukage Original Soundtrack SCDC-00219
Natsuyume Yawa Sound Collection SCDC-00294
NEO GEO DJ Station in Gemudora night ! SCDC-00029
Never7 ~the end of infinity~ Sound Collection SCDC-281
Night Raid SCDC-00084
Ninkyouden Toseinin Ichidaiki Original Soundtrack Ohikennasutte! SCDC-00515
Nintendo Sound History Series "Zelda the Music" SCDC-00395
Nintendo Sound History Series Disk System Rare Selection SCDC-00421~2

O
Omoi no Kakera ~Close To~ Sound Collection SCDC-285
Omoide ni Kawaru Kimi - Memories Off - Sound Collection SCDC-00227
Omoide ni kawaru kimi - Memories Off: Memory collection Vol.3 - Nayuta Kitahara SCDC-00255
Omoide ni Kawaru Kimi Memories Off Vocal Collection SCDC-00287
Omoide ni Kawaru Kimi Memory Collection Vol. 2: Mihu Kashima SCDC-00247
Oriental Magnetic Yellow ~ The Best Album SCDC-00062

P
Pachisuro Original Soundtrack SCDC-00071
Phantasy Star Online Songs of RAGOL Odyssey Soundtrack ~EPISODE 1&2~ SCDC-00215
Phantom Brave Arrange Soundtracks SCDC-00348
Phantom Dust - Original Sound Tracks SCDC-00387
Phantom Kingdom Arrange Album SCDC-00434
Phantom Kingdom Drama Disc 1 SCDC-00435
Pia Carrot 2DX SCDC-00072
Pia Carrot' 2DX - Best Vocal (Song) Collection SCDC-00040
Pia Carrot 2DX Heroine Collection 1 [Azusa Hinomiri] SCDC-00007
Pia Carrot 2DX Heroine Collection 3 Mina Hinomori SCDC-00032
Pia Carrot 2DX Heroine Collection 2 Tsukasa Enomoto SCDC-00021
Prince of Persia: The Sands of Time Original Sound Tracks SCDC-00383

R
Radirgy Original Soundtrack SCDC-00508
Remember 11 Sound Collection SCDC-00340
Remember 11 Vocal Collection SCDC-00367
Remember11 Drama CD SCDC-00354
R-TYPE FINAL ORIGINAL SOUND TRACKS SCDC-288

S
Samurai Champloo Original Soundtrack [Hip Hop Samurai Action] SCDC-00507
Samurai Spirits Shinsho (New Chapter) Kenkaku-ibunroku SCDC-00001
Samurai Spirits Shinsho (New Chapter) Kenkaku-ibunroku Drama CD SCDC-00010
Samurai Spirits Zero Original Soundtrack (Release Cancelled) SCDC-00338
Samurai Western: Katsugeki Samurai-dou Soundtrack SCDC-00402
Scheme Soundtrack / Yuzo Koshiro SCDC-00199
Sega Arcade '80s Vol. 1 ~ Legend '80s Series SCDC-00245
Sega Arcade 80's Vol. 2 ~ Legend 80's Series SCDC-252
Sega Game Music Vol.1 SCDC-00024
Sega Game Music Vol.2 SCDC-00052
Sega Game Music Vol.3 ~ After Burner SCDC-00056
Sega Mega Drive Super Medley SCDC-00450
Sengoku Basara Drama CD SCDC-00462
Sengoku Basara Original Soundtrack SCDC-00460
Sengoku Densho 2001 Original Sound Trax SCDC-00102
Sentimental Prelude Drama CD Part.1 SCDC-00384
Sentimental Prelude Drama CD Part.2 SCDC-00385
Sentimental Prelude Original Soundtrack SCDC-00381
Separate Blue Original Soundtrack SCDC-00264
SHADOW HEARTS Original Soundtrack plus1 SCDC-00116
Shadow Hearts Original Soundtracks plus 1 SCDC-00403
Shin Sekai gakudan zatsugidan Final ~ The 20th Century Memorial Best ~ SCDC-00061
Shining Force: Resurrection of the Dark Dragon - Original Soundtrack SCDC-00365
Silpheed ~PC Sound of Game Arts~ Game Sound Legend Series SCDC-00521
SNK Game Music SCDC-00106
SNK Original Best SCDC-00055
SNK Slot Panic Soundtracks SCDC-00423
Soseiki DE:VADASY SCDC-00017
Space Traveller SCDC-00026
STAR OCEAN BLUE SPHERE Arrange & Sound Trax SCDC-00123
Street Fighter II GSM Capcom 4 (PCCB-00056)
Strikers 1999 OST SCDC-00004
Summer Dream Evening Tale Sound Collection SCDC-294
SUPER XEVIOUS (GAME SOUND LEGEND) SCDC-00099

T
Taito Game Music SCDC-00156
Takahashi Meijin Song Collection - 16 Rensha 20th Anniversary SCDC-464
Take Off! Soundtrack & Character SCDC-295
TearRingSaga Original Sound Track SCDC-00091
TEKKEN 4 Original Sound Tracks SCDC-00181~2
Tendo + Dokuta Soundtracks SCDC-00424
Tentama Drama CD SCDC-00079
Tentama Sound Collection + Alpha SCDC-00073
The Konamic Game Freaks SCDC-00064
The Legend of Zelda: Takt of Wind Original Sound Tracks SCDC-00250~1
THE RETURN OF VIDEO GAME MUSIC SCDC-00122
The Story of Hero Yoshitsune Original Soundtrack SCDC-00401
Toshi shita no Otokonoko SCDC-00128
True Love Story 3 Drama CD term. 1 ~FIRST STEP~ SCDC-00096
True Love Story 3 Drama CD term. 2 ~HAPPY LUNCH TIME~ SCDC-00103
True Love Story 3 Drama CD term. 3 ~TAKE YOUR DREAM!~ SCDC-00125
True Love Story 3 Drama CD term. 4 ~GOING MY WAY~ SCDC-00130
True Love Story 3 Original Soundtrack SCDC-00089
True Love Story 3 Vocal Collection SCDC-00135
True Love Story Special Song Box SCDC-00327
True Love Story Summer Days, and yet... Drama CD SCDC-291
True Love Story Summer Days, and yet... Original Soundtrack SCDC-284
True Love Story Summer days, and yet... Pre Character Series Vol. 1 Hina Kusonese SCDC-00261
True Love Story Summer days, and yet... Pre Character Series Vol. 2 Satomi Kiriya SCDC-00266
True Love Story Summer days, and yet... Pre Character Series Vol. 3 Yuiko Shinosaka SCDC-00267
True Love Story Summer days, and yet... Pre Character Series Vol. 4 Nayu Kamiya SCDC-00268
True Love Story Summer days, and yet... Pre Character Series Vol. 5 Hitomi Arimori SCDC-00269
True Love Story Summer days, and yet... Pre Character Series Vol. 6 Yako Mukai SCDC-00270
True Love Story Summer Days, and yet... Vocal Collection SCDC-296
True Love Story Summer Days, and yet... Vocal Collection SCDC-00296
Twinkle Star Sprites: La Petite Princesse Soundtrack SCDC-00453~4

W
W ~Wish~ Sound Collection SCDC-00374
Wangan Midnight Soundtrack SCDC-00188

Y
Yowaki na Bokura/NERVOUS SCDC-00081
Yukyu final concert Manatsu no sotsugyoshiki (Yukyu Ongakusai) SCDC-00048
Yukyu Gensoukyoku 3 - Perpetual Blue Drama CD: Part 5 SCDC-00027
Yukyu Gensoukyoku 3 - Perpetual Blue Drama CD: Part 6 SCDC-00028
Yukyu Gensoukyoku 3 Perpetual Blue Part.1 SCDC-00018
Yukyu Gensoukyoku 3 Perpetual Blue Part.2 SCDC-00019
Yukyu Gensoukyoku 3 Perpetual Blue Vol.3 SCDC-00022
Yukyu Gensoukyoku 3 Perpetual Blue Vol.4 SCDC-00023
Yukyu Gensoukyoku All Star Project Soundtrack SCDC-00034
Yukyu Gensoukyoku Perpetual Blue SCDC-00037
Yukyu Gensoukyoku Perpetual Blue Part.7 SCDC-00036
Yukyu Kumikyoku All Star Project Vol.2 SCDC-00043
Yukyu Kumikyoku: Audio Drama CD Vol.1 SCDC-00039
Yukyu THE SONGS II SCDC-00085
Yume no Tsubasa Drama CD SCDC-00058
Yume no tsubasa Sound Collection SCDC-00045

See also
List of record labels

External links
Official site (in Japanese)

Japanese record labels
Mass media companies of Japan